is a Japanese art film original video animation (OVA) written and directed by Mamoru Oshii. Released by Tokuma Shoten on 15 December 1985, the film was a collaboration between artist Yoshitaka Amano and Oshii. It features very little spoken dialogue. Its sparse plot and visual style have led to it being described as "animated art rather than a story".

Plot

Angel's Egg follows the life of an unnamed young girl living alone in an undefined building near an abandoned city.  She cares for a large egg which she hides under her dress, protecting it while scavenging the decrepit Neo-Gothic/Art Nouveau cityscape for food, water and bottles. In the prologue, an unnamed boy in militant garb watches an orb-shaped vessel covered with thousands of goddess-like sculptures descend from the sky. Awakened by the orb's whistles, the girl begins her day of scavenging, but soon crosses paths with the boy on a wide street traveled only by biomechanical roving tanks. Frightened by the boy, who carries a cross-shaped device over his shoulder, the girl runs off down an alley. When she returns to investigate, the boy has left. She resumes searching for food and glass bottles, avoiding the statuesque figures of men clutching harpoons.

Later, the girl spots the boy again and approaches him. He turns and surprisingly produces her egg from underneath his cape; she had abandoned it on the plaza where she was eating. He instructs the girl to "Keep precious things inside you or you will lose them," and returns the egg.  When asked what she believes is inside the egg, the girl asserts that she can't tell him. The boy then suggests breaking the egg to find out, which incenses the girl and drives her away, only to be pursued by the boy.

Eventually the chase gives way to the pair bonding, as the stoic fishermen figures spring to life and frighten the girl. The fishermen race after enormous shadows of coelacanth-like fish that swim across the surfaces of streets and buildings. The animated men ineffectually lob their harpoons at the shadows, hitting only brick and stone. As the shadows swim away, the girl explains that while the fish are gone, the men persist in hunting. The pair wait out the commotion within a vast cathedral decorated with stained windows of fish.

Leaving the city and heading towards the girl's settlement, the pair stop within a massive structure which appears to be the carcass of a beached leviathan. Noticing an engraving of a tree on a pillar, the boy describes his memory of a similar tree which grew to hold a giant egg containing a sleeping bird. When the girl inquires as to what the bird dreams of, the boy flatly asks if the girl still won't tell him what's inside her egg. The pair ascend a staircase arrayed with bottles of water, like those the girl collects, on each step. Adding her newest tribute to the line of bottles, the girl and boy reflect on their amnesia, wondering about their identity and purpose. The boy begins to recount the biblical tale of Noah's Ark. The tale deviates when the boy claims that the dove never returned to the ark, and thus its passengers forgot why they were sailing, forgot about the civilization drowned below, forgot about the animals who, as a result, turned to stone.

The boy asks the girl if they themselves or if the strange world they live in really exists, or if it is merely a memory like his image of the sleeping bird. The girl suddenly insists that the bird does exist, and leads the boy down corridors of ancient fossils to arrive at an aerie. There they find the skeleton of a giant, angelic bird. The girl explains her intent to hatch the egg.

Later, the pair warm themselves within the girl's settlement. As the girl drifts off to sleep, she speaks to the creature inside her egg of their future together. Outside, the heavy rain consumes the city and floods the streets. While the girl is turned away from the egg in her sleep, the boy takes it and smashes it, leaving  afterwards. The next day, the girl discovers the broken shell of her egg and shrieks out, utterly heartbroken. She starts to run away from her settlement into the woods, past a giant tree holding a huge egg, in pursuit of the boy. In her haste, she falls into a ravine. Beneath the chasm's water, the girl transforms into an adult woman before releasing a final breath, which rises to the surface as a multitude of bobbing eggs.

As the rain suddenly abates, trees holding eggs like those described by the boy are shown to be scattered throughout the landscape. The boy stands on a vast shore littered with white feathers as the orb-like vessel rises from underneath the ocean. Among the thousands of statues adorning the orb is a new feature: a figure of the girl, sitting serenely on a throne and caressing the egg in her lap. The screen slowly zooms out to reveal that the land of the beach, the forest, and the city is part of a small and lonely island within a vast sea, appearing not unlike the hull of an overturned ship.

Voice actors
Jinpachi Nezu – Boy
Mako Hyōdō – Girl

Nezu worked with Oshii once again in Patlabor 2: The Movie and Mako Hyōdō played a supporting role in The Sky Crawlers.

Themes
Although some publications have indicated that the film is built on director Oshii's supposed loss of faith in Christianity, Oshii himself has stated otherwise in saying that he wasn't a Christian, but he thought quotes from the Bible were cool and had a friend who was Christian. Oshii himself has stated he does not know what the film is about.

The film repurposes ideas that Oshii developed for a cancelled Lupin the Third film (which later became Legend of the Gold of Babylon); both concepts focus on a mysterious girl, while the angel's egg is based on the cancelled film's angel fossil.

Production and release
Angel's Egg was a collaboration between Oshii and Amano. The animation was produced by Studio DEEN, with Hiroshi Hasegawa, Masao Kobayashi, Mitsunori Miura, and Yutaka Wada working as producers. Oshii and Amano collaborated on the script, and Yoshihiro Kanno composed the music.

Angel's Egg was released in the direct-to-video format on 15 December 1985 by Tokuma Shoten. The 71-minute OVA would later be used as the skeleton for the 1987 live-action independent film In the Aftermath directed by Carl Colpaert. Colpaert's movie occasionally intercuts with footage from Oshii's Angel's Egg with dubbed over dialogue, which does not appear in Oshii's film.

Reception
Angel's Egg did not do well with critics on its release, and Oshii stated that "it kept him from getting work for years". However, it is considered "one of the highlights of 'artistic' anime and [his] career as a director." Brian Ruh, a critical analyst of Japanese popular culture, stated that it was "one of the most beautiful and lyric films in the animated medium."

Helen McCarthy called it "an early masterpiece of symbolic film-making", stating that "its surreal beauty and slow pace created a Zen-like atmosphere, unlike any other anime". In his book Horror and Science Fiction Film IV, Donald C Willis described the film as "a haunting, poetic melancholic science-fantasy film, and–for non-Japanese-speaking viewers at least–a very cryptic one." Willis also included the film in his list of most memorable films from 1987-1997.

Bakanow.com called it "Angel's Egg is a real Rorschach test, and the viewer may get one of the multiple meanings behind this beautiful film. Oshii has shown that he has perfectly mastered the art of storytelling without any dialogue." Though the film wasn't perfect, he later stated the movie as a timeless and even "epitome of visual art."

In an article in Senses of Cinema on Oshii, Richard Suchenski stated that the film was Oshii's "purest distillation of both Oshii’s visual mythology and his formal style". The review noted that "Patlabor 2 is more sophisticated, Ghost in the Shell is more important, and Avalon is more mythically complex but the low-tech, hand-drawn Angel's Egg remains Oshii’s most personal film."

Footnotes

References

External links
Bakanow.com review
Mamoru Oshii's Angel's Egg
J-pop.com review

1980s avant-garde and experimental films
1985 anime OVAs
Anime with original screenplays
Fantasy anime and manga
Japanese avant-garde and experimental films
Noah's Ark in popular culture
Post-apocalyptic anime and manga
Studio Deen
1980s Japanese films